Waleed Salim Al-Lami ( Walīd Sālim Al-'Alāmī; born 5 January 1992) is an Iraqi footballer who plays as a right back for Al-Shorta and the Iraq national team.

International career 
On 11 September 2012, Salim made his debut for the Iraq national team, starting against Japan in the 2014 FIFA World Cup qualification, which ended in a 1–0 defeat.

Iraq national team goals 
Scores and results list Iraq's goal tally first.

Honours

Club 
Al Shorta
Iraqi Premier League: 2012–13, 2018–19, 2021–22
Iraqi Super Cup: 2019

International 
Iraq
WAFF Championship: Runner-up 2012
Arabian Gulf Cup: Runner-up 2013
AFC U-22 Championship: 2013
Asian Games: Bronze medalist 2014

Personal life 
Salim is a Shia Muslim and has a tattoo of Husayn ibn Ali on his bicep.

References

External links 
 Profile on Goalzz.com

1992 births
Living people
Iraqi footballers
Iraq international footballers
Sportspeople from Baghdad
Association football fullbacks
Erbil SC players
2015 AFC Asian Cup players
2019 AFC Asian Cup players
Iraqi Shia Muslims
Al-Shorta SC players